Kale, or leaf cabbage, belongs to a group of cabbage (Brassica oleracea) cultivars grown for their edible leaves, although some are used as ornamentals. Kale plants have green or purple leaves, and the central leaves do not form a head (as with headed cabbage). Kales are considered to be closer to wild cabbage than most of the many domesticated forms of Brassica oleracea.

Etymology 
Kale originates from Northern Middle English cale (compare Scots kail and German Kohl) for various cabbages. The ultimate origin is Latin caulis 'cabbage'.

History 

Kale originated in the eastern Mediterranean and Anatolia, where it was cultivated for food beginning by 2000 BCE at the latest. Curly-leaved varieties of cabbage already existed along with flat-leaved varieties in Greece in the 4th century BC. These forms, which were referred to by the Romans as Sabellian kale, are considered to be the ancestors of modern kales.

The earliest record of cabbages in western Europe is of hard-heading cabbage in the 13th century. Records in 14th-century England distinguish between hard-heading cabbage and loose-leaf kale.

Russian traders introduced Russian kale into Canada and then into the United States in the 19th century. USDA botanist David Fairchild is credited with introducing kale (and many other crops) to Americans, having brought it back from Croatia, although Fairchild himself disliked cabbages, including kale. At the time, kale was widely grown in Croatia mostly because it was easy to grow and inexpensive, and could desalinate soil. For most of the twentieth century, kale was primarily used in the United States for decorative purposes; it became more popular as an edible vegetable in the 1990s due to its nutritional value.

During World War II, the cultivation of kale (and other vegetables) in the U.K. was encouraged by the Dig for Victory campaign. The vegetable was easy to grow and provided important nutrients missing from a diet because of rationing.

Cultivation 

Kale is usually an annual plant grown from seed with a wide range of germination temperatures. It is hardy and thrives in wintertime, and can survive in temperatures as low as –15.0° Celsius. Kale can become sweeter after a heavy frost.

Cultivars 

One may differentiate between kale varieties according to the low, intermediate, or high length of the stem, along with the variety of leaf types. The leaf colours range from light green to green, dark green, violet-green, and violet-brown.

Classification by leaf type:
 Curly-leaf (Scots kale, blue curled kale)
 Bumpy-leaf (black cabbage, better known by its Italian translation 'cavolo nero', and also known as Tuscan Cabbage, Tuscan Kale, lacinato and dinosaur kale)
 Plain-leaf (flat-leaf types like red Russian and white Russian kale)
 Leaf and spear, or feathery-type leaf (a cross between curly- and plain-leaf)
Ornamental (less palatable and tougher leaves)

Because kale can grow well into winter, one variety of rape kale is called "hungry gap" after the period in winter in traditional agriculture when little else could be harvested. An extra-tall variety is known as Jersey kale or cow cabbage. Kai-lan or Chinese kale is a cultivar often used in Chinese cuisine. In Portugal, the bumpy-leaved kale is mostly called "couve galega" (Galician kale or Portuguese Cabbage).

Ornamental kale 

Many varieties of kale and cabbage are grown mainly for ornamental leaves that are brilliant white, red, pink, lavender, blue, or violet in the interior of the rosette. The different types of ornamental kale are peacock kale, coral prince, kamone coral queen, color up kale, and chidori kale. Ornamental kale is as edible as any other variety, but potentially not as palatable. Kale leaves are increasingly used as an ingredient for vegetable bouquets and wedding bouquets.

Nutritional value 

Raw kale is composed of 84% water, 9% carbohydrates, 4% protein, and 1% fat (table). In a  serving, raw kale provides  of food energy and a large amount of vitamin K at 3.7 times the Daily Value (DV) (table). It is a rich source (20% or more of the DV) of vitamin A, vitamin C, vitamin B6, folate, and manganese (see table "Kale, raw"). Kale is a good source (10–19% DV) of thiamin, riboflavin, pantothenic acid, vitamin E, and several dietary minerals, including iron, calcium, magnesium, potassium, and phosphorus (see table "Kale, raw"). Boiling raw kale diminishes most of these nutrients, while values for vitamins A, C, and K and manganese remain substantial (see table "Kale, cooked").

Phytochemicals
Kale is a source of the carotenoids, lutein and zeaxanthin (tables). As with broccoli and other cruciferous vegetables, kale contains glucosinolate compounds, such as glucoraphanin, which contributes to the formation of sulforaphane, a compound under preliminary research for its potential to affect human health beneficially.

Boiling kale decreases the level of glucosinate compounds, whereas steaming, microwaving, or stir frying does not cause significant loss. Kale is high in oxalic acid, the levels of which can be reduced by cooking.

Kale contains high levels of polyphenols, such as ferulic acid, with levels varying due to environmental and genetic factors.

Culinary uses

As a snack product 

Flavored "kale chips" have been produced as a potato chip substitute.

Regional uses

Europe

In the Netherlands, a traditional winter dish called "boerenkoolstamppot" is a mix of curly kale and mashed potatoes, sometimes with fried bacon, and served with rookworst ("smoked sausage").

In Northern Germany, there is a winter tradition known as "Kohlfahrt" ("kale trip"), where a group of people will go on a hike through the woods during the day before gathering at an inn or private residence where kale is served, usually with bacon and Kohlwurst ("kale sausage").  Kale is considered a Northern German staple and comfort food.

In Italy, cavolo nero kale is an ingredient of the Tuscan soup ribollita.

A traditional Portuguese soup, caldo verde, combines pureed potatoes, very finely sliced kale, olive oil and salt. Additional ingredients can include broth and sliced, cooked spicy sausage.

In Scotland, kale provided such a base for a traditional diet that the word in some Scots dialects is synonymous with food. To be "off one's kail" is to feel too ill to eat.

In Ireland, kale is mixed with mashed potatoes to make the traditional dish colcannon. It is popular on Halloween, when it may be served with sausages.

Asia

In Sri Lanka, it is known as kola gova or ela gova. It is cultivated for edible use. A dish called 'kale mallung' is served almost everywhere on the island, along with rice.

In literature 
The Kailyard school of Scottish writers, which included J. M. Barrie (creator of Peter Pan), consisted of authors who wrote about traditional rural Scottish life (kailyard = 'kale field'). In Cuthbertson's book Autumn in Kyle and the charm of Cunninghame, he states that Kilmaurs in East Ayrshire was famous for its kale, which was an important foodstuff. A story is told in which a neighbouring village offered to pay a generous price for some kale seeds, an offer too good to turn down. The locals agreed, but a gentle roasting on a shovel over a coal fire ensured the seeds never germinated.

Gallery

See also 
Bowen's Kale
Crambe maritima – sea kale
Leaf vegetable
Kalettes
Cabbage

References

External links 

 Marrow-Stem Kale – Plants for a Future database
 PROTAbase on Brassica oleracea (leaf cabbage)

Brassica oleracea
Leaf vegetables